The 1992 AFL draft is the annual draft of talented players by Australian rules football teams that participate in the main competition of that sport, the Australian Football League. It consisted of the main national draft, the pre-season draft and the trade period.

In 1992 there were 124 picks to be drafted between 15 teams in the main national draft.

1992 mid-season draft 
There was a mid-year draft held during the 1992 season. Players recruited in this draft were able to take their places in their AFL clubs in the latter part of the 1992 season, although not all chose to do so.

Trades

1992 national draft

Draft tampering
The 1992 draft suffered from three high-profile cases of draft tampering involving highly rated South Australian players: No. 6 selection Robert Pyman, No. 10 selection Brett Chalmers, and No. 13 selection Andrew McKay. Prior to the draft, all three players contacted AFL clubs which they did not want to play for, and told those clubs that they would remain in South Australia if drafted by them; at the time, the players could still play a respectable career and earn reasonable money in the SANFL, and would be tied to the AFL club that drafted them for only three years (after which they could re-enter the draft and be selected by another club), so they held a bargaining position to make these demands. However, this action was contrary to the rules, as it circumvented the fairness of the draft.

The most serious offence was by Chalmers, who had contacted most clubs in an effort to ensure that only Collingwood would draft him. McKay and Pyman, who had warned only the AFL's struggling clubs (and ) against drafting them, but had not contrived to end up at a specific club, were fined only $10,000 and were permitted to continue playing for their new clubs.  zone selection Nathan Buckley and the North Melbourne Football Club were also forced to defend accusations that they had come to a draft-tampering agreement for Buckley to later be traded to North Melbourne, but after a long and costly legal battle both parties were found not guilty.

Selections

1993 pre-season draft

References

AFL Draft
Australian Football League draft